Jamberoo is a genus of Australian sheetweb spiders that was first described by Michael R. Gray & H. M. Smith in 2008.

Species
 it contains four species, found in Victoria and New South Wales:
Jamberoo actensis Gray & Smith, 2008 – Australian Capital Territory
Jamberoo australis Gray & Smith, 2008 – Australia (Victoria)
Jamberoo boydensis Gray & Smith, 2008 – Australia (New South Wales)
Jamberoo johnnoblei Gray & Smith, 2008 (type) – Australia (New South Wales)

See also
 List of Stiphidiidae species

References

Araneomorphae genera
Stiphidiidae